The 1950 Christchurch mayoral election was part of the New Zealand local elections held that same year. In 1950, election were held for the Mayor of Christchurch plus other local government positions. The polling was conducted using the standard first-past-the-post electoral method.

Background
Sitting mayor Ernest Andrews did not seek re-election, and former mayor Robert Macfarlane won the position against Bill MacGibbon, who for many years was the chairman of the Tramway Board. The Labour Party gained a majority on the city council, winning twelve seats to the seven won by the Citizens' Association.

Mayoral results
The following table gives the election results:

Council results

References

Mayoral elections in Christchurch
1950 elections in New Zealand
Politics of Christchurch
November 1950 events in New Zealand
1950s in Christchurch